The 2022 All Out was the fourth annual All Out professional wrestling pay-per-view (PPV) event produced by All Elite Wrestling (AEW). It took place during Labor Day weekend on September 4, 2022, at the Now Arena in the Chicago suburb of Hoffman Estates, Illinois. It was the first event to feature the AEW World Trios Championship.

Fifteen matches were contested at the event, including four on the Zero Hour pre-show. In the main event, CM Punk defeated Jon Moxley to win the AEW World Championship for a second time. In other prominent matches, Chris Jericho defeated Bryan Danielson, The Elite (Kenny Omega, Matt Jackson, and Nick Jackson) defeated "Hangman" Adam Page and The Dark Order (Alex Reynolds and John Silver) to win the inaugural AEW World Trios Championship, and in the opening bout, MJF made a surprise return as the disguised "joker" entrant and won the Casino Ladder match. 

All Out received mixed reviews from critics. The event was also infamous for its post-show media scrum, which saw CM Punk insult and berate several fellow wrestlers, leading to a legitimate backstage fight between Punk, The Elite, and Ace Steel. All involved were suspended, with Steel eventually being released; three days after All Out, Punk and The Elite were all stripped of their respective championships.

Production

Background
All Out is a pay-per-view (PPV) held annually during Labor Day weekend by All Elite Wrestling (AEW) since 2019. It is one of AEW's "Big Four" PPVs, which also includes Double or Nothing, Full Gear, and Revolution, their four biggest shows produced quarterly (excluding events run with other companies such as NJPW). On July 13, 2022, AEW announced that the fourth All Out event would take place on September 4 at the Now Arena in the Chicago suburb of Hoffman Estates, Illinois. Additionally as part of All Out week, both of AEW's weekly television programs, Wednesday Night Dynamite and Friday Night Rampage, aired live from the same arena on August 31 and September 2, respectively. Tickets for all three events went on sale on July 15 with bundle packages available. There was also a fanfest on Saturday, September 3 at the Renaissance Schaumburg Convention Center. All Out itself was preceded by a one-hour pre-show called Zero Hour, which aired for free on AEW's social media platforms.

Storylines
All Out featured professional wrestling matches that involved different wrestlers from pre-existing feuds and storylines. Wrestlers portrayed heroes, villains, or less distinguishable characters in events that built tension and culminated in a wrestling match or series of matches. Storylines were produced on AEW's weekly television programs, Dynamite and Rampage, the supplementary online streaming shows, Dark and Elevation, and The Young Bucks' YouTube series Being The Elite.

On the June 3, 2022, episode of Rampage, AEW World Champion CM Punk, who had won the title just days prior at Double or Nothing, announced that he was injured and required surgery. He initially wanted to relinquish the title; however, AEW president Tony Khan decided that an interim champion would be crowned until Punk's return, after which, Punk would face the interim champion to determine the undisputed champion. Jon Moxley was crowned as interim champion at AEW x NJPW: Forbidden Door on June 26. At the Quake by the Lake special episode of Dynamite on August 10, Punk made his return and confronted Moxley, entering into a title dispute. A match to determine the undisputed AEW World Champion was then scheduled at All Out. However, due to heated confrontations between the two, it was announced that the match would instead take place on the August 24 episode of Dynamite, where Moxley quickly defeated Punk due to the latter reaggravating an injury, becoming the undisputed AEW World Champion in the process. The following week on Dynamite, Moxley issued an open contract for a championship match at All Out, in which Punk signed the contract. The championship rematch was then subsequently scheduled for All Out.

Post-event media scrum
In the post-event media scrum, CM Punk took issues with certain members of the wrestling media as he addressed backstage issues with colleagues in AEW. Punk first described Scott Colton (Colt Cabana) as someone who "didn't want to see me at the top," discussed their lawsuits against each other, and said he "hasn't been friends with this guy since at least 2014, late 2013." Later on, Punk stated Colton "shares a bank account with his mother, which tells you all you need to know about what kind of character that is." Punk denied rumors that he had attempted to get Colton fired, which AEW president Tony Khan corroborated. Punk also criticised "irresponsible people who call themselves EVPs" (AEW's executive vice presidents are Kenny Omega, Matt Jackson, and Nick Jackson), saying that they "couldn't fucking manage a Target" and accused them of having "spread lies and bullshit and put into the media that I got [Colt Cabana] fired when I have fuck all to do with him, want nothing to do with him. Do not care where he works, where he doesn't work. Where he eats, where he sleeps." Punk later indicated that he was trying to "sell tickets, fill arenas," while the EVPs were acting as "stupid guys [who] think they're in Reseda," which was where Pro Wrestling Guerrilla was based.

Next, Punk criticized "Hangman" Adam Page as "an empty-headed fucking dumb fuck" who went "into business for himself" on national television, and further alluded to Page as "somebody that hasn't done a damn thing in this business [that has] jeopardized the first million dollar house that this company has drawn off of my back." Punk later said regarding Page: "Our locker room, for all the wisdom and brilliance it has, isn't worth shit when you have an empty-headed idiot, who has never done anything in the business do public interviews and say, 'I don't really take advice.'" Punk went on to describe MJF as a "supremely talented individual" but also said that MJF "likes to shit where he eats instead of watering the grass." Punk then proclaimed to an interviewer, "I'm hurt, I'm old, I'm fuckin' tired, and I work with fucking children."

Multiple wrestling publications, including  Fightful, PWInsider, and the Wrestling Observer Newsletter, later reported that Punk's comments were followed by a fight between Punk, Kenny Omega, The Young Bucks, and Ace Steel — an AEW coach who is Punk's trainer and long-time friend. The Young Bucks and Omega were reportedly injured in the fight, and Steel was subsequently fired. In the aftermath of the media scrum, former wrestling manager and current podcaster Jim Cornette defended Punk's comments, arguing that they were justified by Page's previous actions in the build up to their world title match at Double or Nothing and stating that he had had similar experiences during his time working with Omega and The Young Bucks.

Aftermath
As a result of the physical altercation following the All Out post-event media scrum, AEW president Tony Khan suspended all involved, which included CM Punk, Ace Steel, Kenny Omega, Matt Jackson, Nick Jackson, Pat Buck, Christopher Daniels, Michael Nakazawa, and Brandon Cutler. On September 7, Khan opened that night's episode of Dynamite with a pre-taped video, announcing that the World and Trios Championships were vacated, effective immediately. Death Triangle (Pac, Penta El Zero M, and Rey Fénix) became the new Trios Champions by defeating Best Friends (Chuck Taylor, Trent Beretta, and Orange Cassidy) in a previously scheduled match that Khan converted into a title match. The show also featured the start of a tournament to crown a new World Champion, with the final taking place on September 21 at Dynamite: Grand Slam. At Grand Slam, Jon Moxley defeated Bryan Danielson in the tournament final to win the AEW World Championship for a record third time.

The suspensions of Buck, Daniels, Nakazawa, and Cutler were lifted about two weeks after All Out; according to Dave Meltzer, an independent investigation commissioned by AEW apparently determined that those individuals were trying to break up the fight.

On October 18, Ace Steel was released from the company.

On November 19, in addition to resuming their positions as Executive Vice Presidents, The Elite (Omega and The Young Bucks) returned at AEW's next PPV, Full Gear, where they faced Death Triangle for the Trios Championship in a losing effort. This was later announced to be the first in a Best of Seven Series for the titles. The Best of Seven Series would go all the way to the seventh and final match on the January 11, 2023, episode of Dynamite where The Elite defeated Death Triangle in a ladder match to become two-time AEW World Trios Champions.
 
The injury put Punk on hiatus for at least 8 months. There were reports that Punk and AEW were in talks regarding a buyout of his contract.

Results

AEW World Trios Championship Tournament

See also
2022 in professional wrestling
List of All Elite Wrestling pay-per-view events

Notes

References

External links

2022
2022 All Elite Wrestling pay-per-view events
2022 in Illinois
Events in Hoffman Estates, Illinois
Professional wrestling in the Chicago metropolitan area
September 2022 events in the United States 
Professional wrestling controversies